The Honourable Charles Ewan Law QC (14 June 1792 – 13 August 1850), was a judge and Conservative Party politician in the United Kingdom.

Background and education
Law was the second son of Edward Law, 1st Baron Ellenborough, by Anne Towry, daughter of Captain George Philip Towry, of Shipley, Northumberland. Edward Law, 1st Earl of Ellenborough, was his elder brother. He was educated at St John's College, Cambridge, graduating M.A. in 1812.

Legal and political career
Law was returned to parliament as one of two representatives for Cambridge University in 1835, a seat he held until his death in 1850. He succeeded Newman Knowlys as Recorder of London in 1833 and was a Queen's Counsel.

Family
Law married Elizabeth Sophia (1789–1864), daughter of Sir Edward Nightingale, 10th Baronet, first on 8 May 1811 at Gretna Green, Dumfriesshire, Scotland,
and again on 22 May 1811. They had ten children:

Anne Law (21 January 1815 – 17 February 1837)
Mary Law (20 January 1816 – 23 April 1888), married John Browne, 3rd Baron Kilmaine
Elizabeth Sophia Law (7 October 1817 – 5 December 1888), first abbess of the Poor Clares at Drumshanbo
Edward Law (26 February 1819 – 1 July 1838)
Charles Edmund Towry-Law, 3rd Baron Ellenborough (1820–1890)
Selina Law (29 November 1822 – 12 July 1838)
Frederica Law (19 September 1824 – 15 November 1889, married first Edmund Law (d. 1867) and second Henri Grève, had issue
Emily Octavia Law (29 November 1825 – 28 September 1845)
Gertrude Catherine Law (28 December 1828 – 22 June 1848)
Henry Towry-Law (26 August 1830 – 7 November 1855)

Law died in August 1850, aged 58. His wife survived him by 14 years and died in June 1864.

References

External links

1792 births
1850 deaths
Younger sons of barons
Alumni of St John's College, Cambridge
UK MPs 1835–1837
UK MPs 1837–1841
UK MPs 1841–1847
UK MPs 1847–1852
Conservative Party (UK) MPs for English constituencies
Members of the Parliament of the United Kingdom for the University of Cambridge
English barristers
Recorders of London
English King's Counsel